The Cadet Chapel at the United States Military Academy is a place of Protestant denomination worship for many members of the United States Corps of Cadets.  The chapel is a late example of Gothic Revival architecture, with its cross-shaped floor plan, soaring arches, and ornate stone carvings.  It houses the largest chapel pipe organ in the world, which consists of 23,511 individual pipes. The Cadet Chapel dominates the skyline and sets the architectural mood of the academy. Designed by architect Bertram Goodhue and completed in 1910, it replaced the neoclassical Old Cadet Chapel which had been built in 1836.  The Old Cadet Chapel was deconstructed and relocated to the entrance of the West Point Cemetery, where it stands today.

See also
United States Air Force Academy Cadet Chapel (including Protestant chapel)
United States Naval Academy Chapel
United States Merchant Marine Academy#Mariners' Memorial Chapel

References

External links

For all six USMA chapels, go to Office of the USMA Chaplain and click on "Chapels" in left-hand column. USMA official website. Retrieved 2010-02-06.
 The Cadet Chapel (booklet by the Cadet Chapel Board, 1958)

Cadet Chapel
University and college chapels in the United States
Military chapels of the United States
Churches in Orange County, New York
Bertram Goodhue church buildings
Gothic Revival church buildings in New York (state)
Churches completed in 1910
1910 establishments in New York (state)